Beraki Ghebreselassie is an Eritrean politician. He joined EPLF in 1972 and, since Independence, has held the following positions: member of the Central Council of PFDJ, member of the National Assembly, Secretary of Education, Minister of Information and Ambassador to Germany, The Holy See, Poland, Hungary and Austria. He was arrested in 2001 as part of the G15, a group of ministers and senior EPLF leaders who were pressing for political reforms. No trial was held and it is not known whether he is alive.

References

1946 births
Living people
Members of the National Assembly (Eritrea)
People's Front for Democracy and Justice politicians
Government ministers of Eritrea
Ambassadors of Eritrea to Germany
Ambassadors of Eritrea to the Holy See
Ambassadors of Eritrea to Poland
Ambassadors of Eritrea to Hungary
Ambassadors of Eritrea to Austria